Copper oxalate is an inorganic compound, a salt of copper metal and oxalic acid with the chemical formula . The compound is practically insoluble in water, alcohol, ether, and acetic acid but soluble in ammonium hydroxide. Copper oxalate forms a hydrate, which forms acid-blue crystals.

Synthesis
Copper oxalate can be produced by precipitation from a mixture of a copper (II) salt and a sodium oxalate solution or by reacting copper sulfate with oxalic acid.

Properties
As a hemihydrate, copper oxalate is a blue-white solid that is practically insoluble in water. At 200 °C, it loses its water due to crystallization.

The compound also forms complex salts with alkali metal oxalates and ammonium oxalate:

Uses
Copper oxalate is used as a catalyst for organic reactions, as a stabilizer for acetylated polyformaldehyde and in seed treatment (to repel birds and rodents).

See also
Antipinite

References

Inorganic compounds
Copper compounds
Oxalates